Čáslav is a town in the Czech Republic. It may also refer to:

FK Čáslav, football club in Čáslav
Časlav (name)

See also
Čáslavsko, a municipality and village in the Czech Republic
Čáslavice, a municipality and village in the Czech Republic
Czesław